The Smyth Model S Sidewinder is an all-metal, two-seat side-by-side, low-wing homebuilt aircraft, designed and developed in the United States.

Design and development
In 1958 Jerry Smyth began the design of a monoplane sport aircraft, intended to be easy to build and fly as well as stressed to +9g for aerobatics. Construction of the prototype began in January 1967, taking two years to complete. Smyth's first component-built was a hand-carved wooden control stick grip which he said "he built the plane around". Plans and kits for homebuilding were made available.

Constructed of welded steel tubing with aluminum skinning, the Sidewinder has all-aluminum wings and is stressed to ±9g ultimate loading to allow aerobatics. A sliding canopy covers the cockpit, the landing gear uses some landing gear components from the Wittman Tailwind and conventional controls are fitted but with an all-flying tailplane for pitch control. An unusual under-fuselage spoiler is used for approach control.,  The original design shared the same windscreen as a Thorp T-18.

The prototype attended the 1969  Experimental Aircraft Association convention at Rockford, Illinois, winning the Outstanding Design Award.

Currently the rights to the Smyth Sidewinder are held by EU-Wish, which continues to market the design. 290 sets of plans had been sold by 1972, with at least 46 examples registered and flying.

Specifications

See also

References

External links

Smythe Sindwinder on Pilot Friend

1960s United States sport aircraft
Homebuilt aircraft
Low-wing aircraft
Single-engined tractor aircraft
Aircraft first flown in 1969